"Azonto" is a single by English-Ghanaian recording artist Fuse ODG, featuring vocals from Itz Tiffany. The song was released in the United Kingdom as a digital download on 29 September 2013. The song peaked at number 30 on the UK Singles Chart and at number 38 on the Scottish Singles Chart. The song has also charted in the Netherlands. The song was written by Nana Richard Abiona and Tiffany Hayden.

Music video
The official music video to accompany the single's release was uploaded to YouTube on 15 August 2013. Although another video was first uploaded on 27 October 2011, which has over 25 million views as of April 2017.

While the Azonto dance is a specifically African phenomenon, the music video insights international sentiment within it.  African culture is juxtaposed with whiteness and more westernized tendencies.  Fuse ODG himself wears African prints and giant clay beads, but also a statement cap and Aviators.  Similarly, the featured dancers can be seen wearing clothes varying from dashikis to suits to rompers to jeans, displaying an incredible variety of global trends.  At times, people can be seen wearing plain white masks – a reference to the traditional African mask, but in an ambiguous, multi-culturally inclusive way.  Black and white individuals, both men and women, engage with the Azonto dance everywhere from the middle of the street to stage rooms to clubs, presenting the idea that anyone can participate in the dance at any time.  The lyrics, though English, are sometimes spoken with a British accent, while other times have a Ghanaian twist, again portraying the idea of worldliness.  Between the variety of individuals appearing, clothing utilized, and lyrics sung, the traditionally African “Azonto” can be seen as a trend to be valued and appreciated on a global scale.

Track listing

Chart performance

Weekly charts

Release history

Videography

Trivia
Reggie and Bollie performed a mash up of this and Watch me Whip/Nae Nae for The X Factor UK

References

2013 singles
2013 songs
Fuse ODG songs